The Eko Hospital is a private hospital located at Ikeja  with annex in Ikoyi, Central Lagos, Surulere, Lagos State Nigeria. This hospital was established in 1982 to succeed  Mercy Specialist Clinic, a clinic that operated in the late 1970s to provide health care services to the entire people of Lagos State, Nigeria.
 Eko hospital main objective and goal is to provide a wide range of health services, including secondary services for its local population, regional as well as national health services. Eko hospital, is the first private hospital to be quoted on the floor of the Nigerian Stock Exchange

Facilities
Eko hospital has an annex at Ikeja consisting of about 130 beds space with the basic medical equipment for conducting series of diagnostic test. The Surulere annex is a 40-bed Secondary health care facility.
Other diagnostic equipment includes:
Audiometry Unit, where series of hearing test are conducted  to enhance the identification of the threshold levels.
Dialysis Unit, for the diagnosis and treatment of Kidney
Medical Laboratory, for the diagnosis of various infections and diseases.
A blood bank for the storage and preservation of donated blood for emergency purpose
Physiotherapy Unit to provides a comprehensive service to hospital inpatients,
Radiotherapy Equipment. 
Pathology Laboratory
Psychiatric Testing
Comprehensive Health Screening
CT Scan Computerised Coaxial 
Angiography
Prostate Screening
Tomography
Intensive Care Unit
Fertility Centre (In Vitro Fertilisation Unit)
Radiotherapy Equipment.

References

See also
Ikeja
List of hospitals in Lagos
Randle general hospital

Private hospitals in Lagos
Hospitals established in 1982
1982 establishments in Nigeria
Lagos State